The following results are the 2019 European Mixed Team Badminton Championships's qualification stage.

Summary
The qualification stage was held between 7–9 December 2018 in 7 cities across Europe.

§: Subgroup's winner.

Group composition

Results

Group 1

Group 2

Group 3

Group 4

Group 5

Group 6

Group 7

Subgroup 1

Subgroup 2

Qualifier match

References 

2019
European Mixed Team Badminton Championships qualification
2019 European Mixed Team Badminton Championships qualification
2019 European Mixed Team Badminton Championships qualification
2019 European Mixed Team Badminton Championships qualification
2019 European Mixed Team Badminton Championships qualification
2019 European Mixed Team Badminton Championships qualification
2019 European Mixed Team Badminton Championships qualification
2019 European Mixed Team Badminton Championships qualification
European Mixed Team Badminton Championships
European Mixed Team Badminton Championships
European Mixed Team Badminton Championships
European Mixed Team Badminton Championships
European Mixed Team Badminton Championships
European Mixed Team Badminton Championships
European Mixed Team Badminton Championships
International sports competitions hosted by England
International sports competitions hosted by Moldova
International sports competitions hosted by Portugal
International sports competitions hosted by France
International sports competitions hosted by Germany
International sports competitions hosted by Poland
International sports competitions hosted by Bulgaria